Jaime Cortés (born 26 July 1964) is a former professional tennis player from Colombia.

Biography
Born in Bogotá, Cortés was a right-handed player, based in Fort Lauderdale, Florida.

Between 1989 and 1998 he featured in a total of 11 Davis Cup ties for Colombia, winning seven matches. 

On the professional tour he had a best ranking of 200 in the world and made two appearances in the main draw of the Colombia Open, an ATP Tour tournament in his home city.

Cortés now runs a tennis academy in Bogotá.

References

External links
 
 
 

1964 births
Living people
Colombian male tennis players
Sportspeople from Bogotá
20th-century Colombian people
21st-century Colombian people